San Antonio de Itatí is a town in Corrientes Province, Argentina. It is the head town of the Berón de Astrada Department. Between 1910 and 2013 the municipality had the name Berón de Astrada.

References

External links

Populated places in Corrientes Province